Expo 58, also known as the 1958 Brussels World's Fair, was a world's fair held on the Heysel/Heizel Plateau in Brussels, Belgium, from 17 April to 19 October 1958. It was the first major world's fair registered under the Bureau International des Expositions (BIE) after World War II.

Background
Expo 58 was the eleventh world's fair hosted by Belgium, and the fifth in Brussels, following the fairs in 1888, 1897, 1910 and 1935. In 1953, Belgium won the bid for the next world's fair, winning out over other European capitals such as Paris and London.

Many of the buildings were re-used from the 1935 World's Fair, which had been held on the same site.

The theme of Expo 58 was "Bilan du monde, pour un monde plus humain" (in English: "Evaluation of the world for a more humane world"), a motto inspired by faith in technical and scientific progress, as well as post-war debates over the ethical use of atomic power.

The exhibition attracted some 41.5 million visitors, making Expo 58 the second largest World's Fair after the 1900 Exposition Universelle et Internationale de Paris, which had attracted 48 million visitors. Every 25 years starting in 1855, Belgium had staged large national events to celebrate its national independence following the Belgian Revolution of 1830. However, the Belgian Government under Prime Minister Achille Van Acker decided to forego celebrations in 1955 to have additional funding for the 1958 Expo. Since Expo 58, Belgium has not organised any more world's fairs.

Exhibition

More than forty nations took part in Expo 58, with more than forty-five national pavilions, not including those of the Belgian Congo and Belgium itself.

The site is best known for the Atomium, a giant model of a unit cell of an iron crystal (each sphere representing an atom). More than 41 million visitors visited the site, which was opened with a call for world peace and social and economic progress, issued by King Baudouin I.

Notable exhibitions include the Philips Pavilion, where "Poème électronique", commissioned specifically for the location, was played back from 425 loudspeakers, placed at specific points as designed  by Iannis Xenakis, and Le Corbusier.

Belgian Congo Section
The Belgian Congo, today known as the Democratic Republic of the Congo, was at that time a Belgian colonial holding. Expo organizers also included participants from the UN Trust Territories of Ruanda-Urundi (today, Rwanda and Burundi) in the Belgian Congo section, without differentiation. This section was divided into seven pavilions: the Belgian Congo and Ruanda-Urundi Palace, agriculture; Catholic missions; insurance, banks, trade; mines and metallurgy; energy, construction, and transport; a village indigène (indigenous village). The Belgian Congo section was, above all, intended to display the "civilizing" work of the Belgian colonialism. The ville indigène is of the most notable modern "human zoos" of the 20th century.

Human zoo
Another exhibition at the Belgian pavilion was the Congolese village that some have branded a human zoo.

The Ministry of Colonies built the Congolese exhibit, intending to demonstrate their claim to have "civilized" the "primitive Africans." Native Congolese art was rejected for display, as the Ministry claimed it was "insufficiently Congolese." Instead, nearly all of the art on display was created by Europeans in a purposefully primitive and imitative style, and the entrance of the exhibit featured a bust of King Leopold II, under whose colonial rule millions of Congolese died. The 700 Congolese chosen to be exhibited by the Ministry were educated urbanites referred to by Belgians as évolués, meaning literally "evolved," but were made to dress in "primitive" clothing, and an armed guard blocked them from communicating with white Belgians who came to observe them. The exotic nature of the exhibit was lauded by visitors and international press, with the Belgian socialist newspaper Le Peuple praising the portrayal of Africans, saying it was "in complete agreement with historical truth." However, in mid-July the Congolese protested the condescending treatment they were receiving from spectators and demanded to be sent home, abruptly ending the exhibit and eliciting some sympathy from European newspapers.

National pavilions

Austria
The Austrian pavilion was designed by Austrian architect Karl Schwanzer in modernist style. It was later transferred to Vienna to host the museum of the 20th century. In 2011 it was reopened under the new name 21er Haus. It included a model Austrian Kindergarten, which doubled as a day care facility for the employees, the Vienna Philharmonic playing behind glass, and a model nuclear fusion reactor that fired every 5 minutes.

Czechoslovakia

The exposition "One Day in Czechoslovakia" was designed by Jindřich Santar who cooperated with artists Jiří Trnka, Antonín Kybal, Stanislav Libenský and Jan Kotík. Architects of the simple, but modern and graceful construction were František Cubr, Josef Hrubý and Zdeněk Pokorný. The team's artistic freedom, so rare in the hard-line communist regime of the 1950s, was ensured by the government committee for exhibitions chairman František Kahuda. He supported the famous Laterna Magika show, as well as Josef Svoboda's technically unique Polyekran. The Czechoslovak pavilion was visited by 6 million people and was officially awarded the best pavilion of the Expo 58.

Liechtenstein
The Liechtenstein pavilion featured a bronze bust of Franz Joseph II at the entrance, a collection of weapons, stamps, and important historical documents from the Principality, paintings from the Prince's personal collection, and exhibits showcasing Liechtenstein's industry, landscape, and religious history. Also featured in the building was an interior garden with a circular walkway enabling visitors to browse the entire pavilion.

Mexico
This was designed by the architect Pedro Ramírez Vázquez. It was awarded the exposition's star of gold.

City of Paris
The city of Paris had its own pavilion, separate from the France exhibit.

United Kingdom
This was produced by the designer James Gardner, architect Howard Lobb and engineer Felix Samuely. The on-site British architect was Michael Blower, Brussels born and bilingual.

USSR

The Soviet pavilion was a large impressive building which was folded up and taken back to Russia when Expo 58 ended. There was a facsimile of Sputnik on display, which mysteriously disappeared and the USSR accused the US of stealing it. There was a bookstore selling science and technology books in English and other languages published by the Moscow Press. In the exposition there was also a model of Lenin the first nuclear icebreaker, and Soviet automobiles: GAZ-21 Volga, GAZ-13 Chaika, ZIL-111, Moskvitch 407 and 423, trucks GAZ-53 and MAZ-525. The Soviet exposition was awarded with a Grand Prix.

United States
The US pavilion was quite spacious and included a fashion show with models walking down a large spiral staircase, an electronic computer that demonstrated a knowledge of history, and a color television studio behind glass. It also served as the concert venue for performance by the Seventh Army Symphony Orchestra under the direction of Edward Lee Alley. It was designed by architect Edward Durell Stone.  It would also play host to the University of California Marching Band which had financed its own way to the fair under the direction of James Berdahl. The United States pavilion consisted of 4 buildings, one of which hosted America the Beautiful, a 360° movie attraction in Circarama made by Walt Disney Productions. The film would subsequently travel to the American National Exhibition in Moscow in 1959, and would find its first American audiences at Disneyland in Anaheim in 1960.

Federal Republic of Germany
The West German pavilion was designed by the architects Egon Eiermann and Sep Ruf. The world press called it the most polished and sophisticated pavilion of the exhibition.

Yugoslavia
The pavilion of Yugoslavia was designed by the architect Vjenceslav Richter, who originally proposed to suspend the whole structure from a giant cable-stayed mast. When that proved too complicated, Richter devised a tension column consisting of six steel arches supported by a pre-stressed cable, which stood in front of the pavilion as a visual marker and symbolized Yugoslavia's six constituent republics. Filled with modernist art, the pavilion was praised for its elegance and simplicity and Richter was awarded as Knight of the Order of the Belgian Crown. After the end of Expo 58, the pavilion was sold and reconstructed as a school in the Belgian municipality of Wevelgem, where it still stands.

Gallery

Transport
 As many visitors were expected, SABENA temporarily increased capacity by renting a couple of Lockheed Constellations.
 For the same reason, and well in time, it was decided to add a new terminal to the Melsbroek national airport; it was to be at the west side of the airport, on the grounds of the municipality of Zaventem, which has since given its name to the airport. A very modern addition was the railway station in the airport, offering direct train service to the city centre, though not to the expo itself.
 Several tram lines were built to serve the site, those to Brussels remain in service.

Mozart's Requiem incident

The autograph of Mozart's Requiem was placed on display. At some point, someone was able to gain access to the manuscript, tearing off the bottom right-hand corner of the second to last page (folio 99r/45r), containing the words "Quam olim d: C:".  the perpetrator has not been identified and the fragment has not been recovered.

International film poll
The event offered the occasion for the organization by thousands of critics and filmmakers from all over the world, of the first universal film poll in history. The poll received nominations from 117 critics from 26 nations. Броненосец Потёмкин (Battleship Potemkin) received 100 votes with The Gold Rush second with 95.

A jury of young filmmakers (Robert Aldrich, Satyajit Ray, Alexandre Astruc, Michael Cacoyannis, Juan Bardem, Francesco Maselli and Alexander Mackendrick) were due to select a winner from the nominees but voted not to.  Instead they indicated the following as still holding value to young filmmakers: Battleship Potemkin; Grand Illusion; Mother; The Passion of Joan of Arc; The Gold Rush and Bicycle Thieves.

See also

 The logo for Expo 58 was designed by Lucien De Roeck, and posters based on it were produced by De Roeck and by Leo Marfurt
 The 50th anniversary of Expo 58 was selected as the main motif of a high-value collectors' coin: the Belgian €100 50th Anniversary of the International Expo in Belgium commemorative coin, minted in 2008. In the obverse, the logo of the event is depicted together with the number 50, representing its 50th anniversary.

References

Notes

Bibliography
The Architecture of Expo 58 by Rika Devos & Mil De Kooning (eds). Dexia/Mercatorfonds, 2006.

External links

 Official website of the BIE
 1958 Brussels - approximately 160 links
 Expo '58 and a Flash-based 
 A Brief History of Belgium's World's Fair Showcase
 Brussels World's Fair approaches completion, a March 17, 1958 Universal  newsreel clip from the Internet Archive

World's fairs in Brussels
1958 in Belgium
1950s in Brussels
1958 festivals
Nuclear power in Belgium